The Women's 20 km race walk event at the 2005 World Championships in Athletics was held on August 7 in the streets of Helsinki with the start at 11:35h local time, and the goal line situated in the Helsinki Olympic Stadium. Russia's  Olimpiada Ivanova won the race in a world record time of 1:25:41 hours.

Medalists

Abbreviations
All times shown are in hours:minutes:seconds

Intermediates

Finishing times
  Olimpiada Ivanova, Russia 1:25:41 (WR)
  Ryta Turava, Belarus 1:27:05 (NR)
  Susana Feitor, Portugal 1:28:44 (SB)
  María Vasco, Spain 1:28:51 (SB)
  Barbora Dibelková, Czech Republic 1:29:05 (NR)
  Athina Papayianni, Greece 1:29:21 (SB)
  Elisa Rigaudo, Italy 1:29:52
  Claudia Stef, Romania 1:30:07
  Song Hongjuan, China 1:30:32
  Yuliya Voyevodina, Russia 1:30:34
  Melanie Seeger, Germany 1:31:00
  Kristina Saltanovic, Lithuania 1:31:23 (SB)
  Elena Ginko, Belarus 1:31:36
  Ana Maria Groza, Romania 1:31:48 (SB)
  Vera Santos, Portugal 1:32:17
  Maria Teresa Gargallo, Spain 1:32:24
  Svetlana Tolstaya, Kazakhstan 1:32:40
  Tatyana Gudkova, Russia 1:33:05
  Geovana Irusta, Bolivia 1:33:19
  Jane Saville, Australia 1:33:44
  Cheryl Webb, Australia 1:33:58
  Jolanta Dukure, Latvia 1:34:24 (SB)
  Sabine Zimmer, Germany 1:34:24
  Mária Gáliková, Slovakia 1:34:38 (PB)
  Gisella Orsini, Italy 1:35:05
  Vira Zozulya, Ukraine 1:35:12
  Inês Henriques, Portugal 1:35:44
  María José Poves, Spain 1:36:12
  Kim Mi-Jung, South Korea 1:37:01
  Sonata Milušauskaitė, Lithuania 1:37:17
  Mayumi Kawasaki, Japan 1:37:30
  Monica Svensson, Sweden 1:38:11
  Graciela Mendoza, Mexico 1:39:56
  Mabel Oncebay, Peru 1:40:46
  Outi Sillanpää, Finland 1:41:03

Athletes who did not finish 
  Sachiko Konishi, Japan
  Teresa Vaill, United States
  Yelena Nikolayeva, Russia
  Miriam Ramón, Ecuador
  Nataliya Misyulya, Belarus
  Wang Liping, China

Athletes disqualified 
  Olive Loughnane, Ireland
  Athanasia Tsoumeleka, Greece
  Cristina López, El Salvador
  Jiang Jing, China
  Evelyn Núñez, Guatemala
  Gulnara Mammadova, Azerbaijan

See also
2005 Race Walking Year Ranking

References

External links
IAAF results

20 km walk women
Racewalking at the World Athletics Championships
2005 in women's athletics